The Browns River is a  river, primarily tidal, in southeastern New Hampshire in the United States.

The river rises in the town of Seabrook just east of U.S. Route 1 and quickly enters the salt marsh and tidewater. For most of its length, the river forms the boundary between Seabrook and Hampton Falls. The river runs along the north side of Seabrook Station Nuclear Power Plant, then ends in Hampton Harbor, where it joins the Hampton River.

See also

List of rivers of New Hampshire

References

Rivers of New Hampshire
Rivers of Rockingham County, New Hampshire